The following is a list of Registered Historic Places in Ottawa County, Michigan.



|}

See also

 List of Michigan State Historic Sites in Ottawa County, Michigan
 List of National Historic Landmarks in Michigan
 National Register of Historic Places listings in Michigan
 Listings in neighboring counties: Allegan, Kent, Muskegon

References

Ottawa County
Ottawa County, Michigan